Dactylellina is a genus  mitosporic fungi in the family Orbiliaceae. There are 16 species.

Species
Dactylellina arcuata (Scheuer & J. Webster) Ying Yang & Xing Z. Liu 2006
Dactylellina candida (Nees) Yan Li 2005
Dactylellina candidum (Nees) Yan Li 2006
Dactylellina cionopaga (Drechsler) Ying Yang & Xing Z. Liu 2006
Dactylellina daliensis H.Y. Su 2008
Dactylellina ferox (Onofri & S. Tosi) M. Scholler, Hagedorn & A. Rubner 1999
Dactylellina formosana (J.Y. Liou, G.Y. Liou & Tzean) M. Scholler, Hagedorn & A. Rubner 1999
Dactylellina haptospora (Drechsler) M. Scholler, Hagedorn & A. Rubner 1999
Dactylellina haptotyla (Drechsler) M. Scholler, Hagedorn & A. Rubner 1999 
Dactylellina hertziana (M. Scholler & A. Rubner) M. Scholler, Hagedorn & A. Rubner 1999
Dactylellina huisuniana (J.L. Chen, T.L. Huang & Tzean) M. Scholler, Hagedorn & A. Rubner 1999
Dactylellina illaqueata D.S. Yang & M.H. Mo 2006
Dactylellina parvicolle (Drechsler) Yan Li 2006
Dactylellina quercus Bin Liu, Xing Z. Liu & W.Y. Zhuang 2005
Dactylellina sichuanensis Yan Li, K.D. Hyde & K.Q. Zhang 2006
Dactylellina varietas Yan Li, K.D. Hyde & K.Q. Zhang 2006

References
http://www.indexfungorum.org

Helotiales
Leotiomycetes genera